
Gmina Dłutów is a rural gmina (administrative district) in Pabianice County, Łódź Voivodeship, in central Poland.

Villages
Gmina Dłutów contains the villages and settlements of Budy Dłutowskie, Czyżemin, Dąbrowa, Dłutów, Dłutówek, Drzewociny, Huta Dłutowska, Kociołki-Las, Łaziska, Lesieniec, Leszczyny Duże, Leszczyny Małe, Mierzączka Duża, Orzk, Pawłówek, Piętków, Redociny, Ślądkowice, Stoczki-Porąbki, Świerczyna and Tążewy.

Neighbouring gminas
Gmina Dłutów is bordered by the gminas of Dobroń, Drużbice, Grabica, Pabianice, Tuszyn and Zelów.

References

Polish official population figures 2006

Dlutow
Pabianice County